Afrogarypus seychellesensis is a species of pseudoscorpions that is endemic to Praslin in the Seychelles. It is only known from its type specimen, and has not been seen since. If it is still extant, it would be threatened by the habitat deterioration caused by invasive plants.

References

Garypoidea
Geogarypidae
Animals described in 1940
Critically endangered animals
Endemic fauna of Seychelles